Gailes railway station was a railway station approximately two miles south of the town of Irvine, North Ayrshire, Scotland. The station was originally part of the Glasgow, Paisley, Kilmarnock and Ayr Railway (now the Ayrshire Coast Line).

History 
The station opened on 5 August 1839, and closed permanently on 2 January 1967.

Accidents 
On 23 February 2007, a Ford Transit van was hit by a southbound commuter train on the level crossing at the site of the former Gailes station.  The driver of the van was killed.

References

Notes

Sources 
 

Disused railway stations in North Ayrshire
Railway stations in Great Britain opened in 1839
Railway stations in Great Britain closed in 1967
Beeching closures in Scotland
Former Glasgow and South Western Railway stations